Sanjeevan Hospital is a private hospital located in Daryaganj, New Delhi.

The hospital was founded by Dr. Prem Aggarwal, a cardiologist and specialist in critical care, along with a group of senior doctors from Maulana Azad Medical College in 1983. The hospital has more than 100 beds and 10 bedded ICU.

It bagged the NABH recognition in the year 2017 and is on the panel of Central Government Health Services (CGHS), Government of India  and Delhi Governemnt Employment Health Scheme (DGEHS)

Facilities Available
The departments which are available are as follows:
Cardiology
Critical Care
Dermatology
Diabetes & Lifestyle
ENT Treatment
Gastroenterology
General Surgery
Internal Medicine
Nephrology
Neurosurgery
Obstetrics and Gynaecology
Oncology & Onco-surgery
Operation Theatre
Orthopedics
Pediatrics & Neonatology
Plastic Surgery & Burns
Psychiatry
Respiratory & TB Clinic
Urology & Andrology
Dental Care
Dietary & Nutrition
Physiotherapy
24/7 Ambulance Services
24/7 Laboratory
24/7 Pharmacy

References

Healthcare in Delhi
Hospitals in Delhi